The next Kerala legislative assembly election is scheduled to be held in May 2026 to elect all 140 members of the Kerala Legislative Assembly. Pinarayi Vijayan is the incumbent Chief Minister of Kerala.

Background 
The tenure of Kerala Legislative Assembly is scheduled to end on 23 May 2026. The previous assembly elections were held on 6 April 2021. The LDF formed the government for the second consecutive time and became the first incumbent coalition to be re-elected and Pinarayi Vijayan became the first chief minister to be re-elected after completing a full term (five years) in office.

Schedule

Parties and alliances 
The Left Democratic Front (LDF) is a coalition of centre-left to left-wing political parties, led by the Communist Party of India (Marxist) (CPIM). The United Democratic Front (UDF) is an alliance of centrist to centre-left political parties led by the Indian National Congress (INC). The National Democratic Alliance (NDA) led by Bharatiya Janata party (BJP) is a coalition of right-wing parties.







References

State Assembly elections in Kerala
Kerala